The South Carolina State Bulldogs and Lady Bulldogs (also SC State) sponsors fourteen sports teams representing South Carolina State University in Orangeburg, South Carolina in intercollegiate athletics, including men’s and women's basketball, cross country, tennis, and indoor and outdoor track and field; women's-only soccer, softball, and volleyball; and men's-only football. The Bulldogs compete in the NCAA Division I Football Championship Subdivision (FCS) and most teams are members of the Mid-Eastern Athletic Conference; the women's soccer team plays as an independent.

Teams

References

External links